Indira Sharma is an Indian psychiatrist specialising in child psychiatry and women's mental health. She is a professor and head of the psychiatry department at Banaras Hindu University.  In January 2013, she was elected president of the Indian Psychiatric Society.

References

Indian psychiatrists
Academic staff of Banaras Hindu University
Living people
Indian women medical doctors
20th-century Indian women scientists
20th-century Indian medical doctors
Medical doctors from Uttar Pradesh
20th-century women physicians
Year of birth missing (living people)